Events from the year 2014 in Taiwan, Republic of China. This year is numbered Minguo 103 according to the official Republic of China calendar.

Incumbents
 President – Ma Ying-jeou
 Vice President – Wu Den-yih
 Premier – Jiang Yi-huah, Mao Chi-kuo
 Vice Premier – Mao Chi-kuo, Chang San-cheng

Events

January
 20 January – The establishment of V Air.
 22 January – The National Development Council was established by the merger of Council for Economic Planning and Development and Research, Development and Evaluation Commission.
 25 January – 2014 ROC Presidential Office Building Truck Attack.
 26 January – The National Museum of Marine Science and Technology was opened in Keelung City.

February
 3 February – The Ministry of Science and Technology was established as an upgrade from the National Science Council.
 4 February – The reclassification of Fuxing, Heping, Maolin, Namasia, Taoyuan and Wulai from District to Special Municipal Mountain Indigenous District.
 17 February – The Ministry of Labor was established as an upgrade from the Council of Labor Affairs.
 28 February – 67th anniversary of the February 28 Incident.

March
 18 March – Sunflower Student Movement.

April
 14 April – The Kaohsiung Exhibition Center opened in Cianjhen District, Kaohsiung City.
 19 April – Sean Lien elected to be KMT candidate for Mayor of Taipei election.
 23 April – The opening of Wind Lion Plaza in Jinhu Township, Kinmen.
 27 April – The construction of Lungmen Nuclear Power Plant in Gongliao District, New Taipei City is halted.
 30 April – Eric Chu, Hau Lung-pin and Jason Hu appointed as Vice Chairmen of Kuomintang.

May
 21 May – A mass stabbing occurred on the Taipei Metro Blue Line, killing four and injuring 24 people.
 27 May – Broad One China Framework proposed by seven politicians and academics led by former Democratic Progressive Party Chairman Shih Ming-teh.
 28 May – Tsai Ing-wen became the Chairperson of Democratic Progressive Party for the second time.
 30 May – Taoyuan County Deputy Magistrate Ye Shi-wen was removed from his position due to the alleged bribery involving Farglory Land Development Co.

June
 3 June – The upgrade of Luzhu Township in Taoyuan County to a county-administered city.
 4 June – Wu Den-yih appointed as First Vice Chairman of Kuomintang, replacing Secretary-General Tseng Yung-chuan.
 7 June – The start of 2014 Intercity Football League.
 12–15 June – 2014 Asian Junior Athletics Championships in Taipei Municipal Stadium, Taipei City.
 14 June
 The reopening of Hayashi Department Store in West Central District, Tainan City.
 The inauguration of Linhousilin Forest Park in Chaozhou Township, Pingtung County.
 18 June – The official opening of the new Ministry of Health and Welfare building in Nangang District, Taipei from the former building in Datong District, Taipei.
 25 June – Director of Taiwan Affairs Office Zhang Zhijun visited Taiwan and met with Minister of Mainland Affairs Council Wang Yu-chi, the highest level government of the People's Republic of China to ever visited Taiwan.
 26 June – Hla'alua and Kanakanavu tribes were recognized as the 15th and 16th tribes of Taiwanese aborigines.
 27 June – The closure of Quebec Office in Taipei.
 28 June – 25th Golden Melody Awards at Taipei Arena in Songshan District, Taipei City.
 30 June – Handover of Dadan Island and Erdan Island from ROC military to Kinmen County Government.

July
 1 July – The appointment of Liu Ching-chung as the acting Minister Hakka Affairs Council, replacing Huang Yu-cheng after his resignation to have more time for his family.
 7–11 July – The visit of Fujian Communist Party Chief You Quan to Taiwan for a 5-day visit.
 14 July – The appointment of Chen Der-hwa as the acting Minister of Education, replacing Chiang Wei-ling after his resignation over an alleged academic fraud.
 14–20 July – 2014 OEC Kaohsiung
 15 July – The appointment of Andrew Kao as the Deputy Minister of Foreign Affairs.
 15–20 July – 2014 Chinese Taipei Open Grand Prix Gold in Taipei Arena, Taipei.
 16–27 July – 2014 Asian Junior Women's Volleyball Championship in Taipei.
 23 July
 Typhoon Matmo struck Taiwan.
 TransAsia Airways Flight 222 crash landed in Huxi Township, Penghu County.
 24 July – The appointment of Hao Feng-ming as the acting Minister of Labor, replacing Pan Shih-wei after his resignation over extramarital affair.
 28 July – The establishment of Taiwan Film Institute in Zhongzheng District, Taipei.
 31 July – Multiple explosions hit Kaohsiung after gas leaks.

August
 1 August
 The election of Chang Po-ya and Sun Ta-chuan to become the President and Vice President of Control Yuan replacing Wang Chien-shien and Chen Jinn-lih respectively.
 The establishment of National Pingtung University in Pingtung County by merging National Pingtung University of Education and National Pingtung Institute of Commerce.
 7 August – Minister of Economic Affairs Chang Chia-juch tendered his resignation from his ministerial post, but was asked by Premier Jiang Yi-huah to stay.
 9–17 August – 2014 William Jones Cup.
 10 August
 Executive Yuan approved Chang Chia-juch's resignation and appointed Woody Duh as Minister of Economic Affairs.
 The establishment of Trees Party.
 15 August – An explosion in Xindian District of Taipei City which led to two deaths and 14 injuries.
 16 August
 The appointment of Lin Chu-chia as the Special Deputy Minister of Mainland Affairs Council, replacing Chang Hsien-yao after his resignation due to family reason.
 The appointment of Shih Hui-fen as the Deputy Minister of Mainland Affairs Council, replacing Lin Chu-chia after his promotion to Special Deputy Minister.
 20 August – The appointment of Chen Hsiung-wen as the Minister of Labor.
 21 August – The approval of 2015 Taiwanese federal budget by the Executive Yuan.

September
 4 September – The start of the first case of 2014 Taiwan food scandal involving Chang Guann Co.
 6 September – The establishment of Cross-Strait Taiwanese Business People Chinese Nationalist Party Fan Club in Taipei.
 14 September – 20th National Congress of Kuomintang in Chiayi City.
 15 September
 37.6 °C of temperature recorded in Kaohsiung, the highest ever since record keeping in 1932.
 The percentage of Taiwan electricity operating reserves fell to 3.44% of the peak load at 1:44 p.m., the lowest level in 2014.
 19 September – The first 7-Eleven store opened in Orchid Island.
 21 September – The landfall of Tropical Storm Fung-wong.
 26 September – The first flight of Tigerair Taiwan, flying from Taiwan to Singapore.
 27 September – The opening of Gaomei Lighthouse in Qingshui District, Taichung City.

October
 3 October – The appointment of Lin Tzou-yien as the acting Minister of Health and Welfare, replacing Chiu Wen-ta after his resignation due to the tainted lard oil scandal.
 9 October – The start of the second case of 2014 Taiwan food scandal involving Ting Hsin International Group.
 10 October – The Ocean Researcher V sinks off Penghu.
 17 October – The appointment of Chiang Been-huang as the Minister of Health and Welfare.
 21 October – An AIDC AT-3 crashes in Ziguan District, Kaohsiung, killing the pilot, Chuang Pei-yuan.
 22 October
 The swearing in of Chiang Been-huang as the Minister of Health and Welfare.
 The establishment of Food Safety Office of the Executive Yuan as an upgrade from the former Food Safety Promotion Task Force.
 25 October – The opening of Hakka Round House in Houlong Township, Miaoli County.
 29 October – The announcement by Interior Minister Chen Wei-zen of banning to study in Mainland China for senior civil servants and officials whose work is related to national security starting 30 October 2014.
 31 October – The inauguration of Starlight Bridge in New Taipei.

November
 1 November
 A factory explosion in Changhua County injuring six people.
 Monument to commemorate the Cepo' Incident opened at Jingpu Elementary School in Fengbin Township, Hualien County.
 4 November – Car attack on the official residence of President Ma Ying-jeou in Taipei.
 8 November – The funeral ceremony of the crashed AIDC AT-3 pilot Chuang Pei-yuan at Republic of China Air Force Academy.
 15 November
 The new Songshan-Xindian Line of Taipei Metro began its services.
 The renaming of Nanjing East Road Station to Nanjing Fuxing Station.
 16 November – The opening of Yilan Museum of Art in Yilan City, Yilan County.
 20 November – The reopening of Sanduo, Kaisyuan and Yishin Roads in Kaohsiung after being damaged by the multiple gas explosions on 31 July.
 23 November
 The 120th founding anniversary celebration of Kuomintang in Taichung.
 The opening of National Taichung Theater in Taichung.
 25 November – The 5-day visit of Marshall Islands President Christopher Loeak to Taiwan.
 29 November
 The 2014 Republic of China local and municipal election.
 Ko Wen-je (Independent) elected as Mayor of Taipei City.
 Incumbent Eric Chu (KMT) reelected as Mayor of New Taipei City.
 Cheng Wen-tsan (DPP) elected as Mayor of Taoyuan City.
 Lin Chia-lung (DPP) elected as Mayor of Taichung City.
 Incumbent William Lai (DPP) reelected as Mayor of Tainan City.
 Incumbent Chen Chu (DPP) reelected as Mayor of Kaohsiung City.
 Lin Yu-chang (DPP) elected as Mayor of Keelung City.
 Lin Chih-chien (DPP) elected as Mayor of Hsinchu City.
 Twu Shiing-jer (DPP) elected as Mayor of Chiayi City.
 Incumbent Lin Tsung-hsien (DPP) reelected as Magistrate of Yilan County.
 Incumbent Chiu Ching-chun (KMT) reelected as Magistrate of Hsinchu County.
 Hsu Yao-chang (KMT) elected as Magistrate of Miaoli County.
 Wei Ming-ku (DPP) elected as Magistrate of Changhua County.
 Lin Ming-chen (KMT) elected as Magistrate of Nantou County.
 Lee Chin-yung (DPP) elected as Magistrate of Yunlin County.
 Incumbent Helen Chang (DPP) reelected as Magistrate of Chiayi County.
 Incumbent Justin Huang (KMT) reelected as Magistrate of Taitung County.
 Pan Meng-an (DPP) elected as Magistrate of Pingtung County.
 Incumbent Fu Kun-chi (Independent) reelected as Magistrate of Hualien County.
 Chen Kuang-fu (DPP) elected as Magistrate of Penghu County.
 Chen Fu-hai (Independent) elected as Magistrate of Kinmen County.
 Liu Cheng-ying (KMT) elected as Magistrate of Lienchiang County.
 Resignation of Jiang Yi-huah from Premier of the Republic of China.
 30 November
 Resignation of Hau Lung-pin from Vice Chairman of Kuomintang.
 Resignation of Woody Duh from Minister of Economic Affairs.

December
 1 December
 Resignation of Wu Den-yih as First Vice Chairman of Kuomintang.
 Resignation of Lung Ying-tai from Minister of Culture.
 Fire broke out at Alishan National Scenic Area in Chiayi County spreading over more than 5 hectares of land.
 The six-day visit of Nauru President Baron Waqa to Taiwan.
 2 December – A man from Hong Kong became the 9,000,000th international visitor to Taiwan in 2014.
 3 December
 Resignation of Ma Ying-jeou as Chairman of Kuomintang.
 Appointment of Wu Den-yih as acting Chairman of Kuomintang.
 Appointment of Mao Chi-kuo as the Premier of the Republic of China.
 First batch of 60 Sikorsky UH-60 Black Hawk helicopter package purchased from the United States arrived in Kaohsiung.
 Garuda Indonesia announces the closure of its Taiwan office.
 5 December – The appointment of Chang San-cheng as the designated Vice Premier of the Republic of China.
 6 December – The 18th Taipei Culture Award.
 8 December
 The opening of National Taitung University Library and Information Center in Taitung City, Taitung County.
 The swearing-in of the new cabinet under Premier Mao Chi-kuo.
 9 December – The 8-day visit of ARATS President Chen Deming to Taiwan.
 10 December
 Ministry of the Interior announced that Mainland Chinese tourists can apply for Exit and Entry Permit upon arrival for visits to Kinmen, Penghu and Lienchiang Counties.
 The 35th anniversary commemoration of Kaohsiung Incident in Taipei.
 Two reactors of Jinshan Nuclear Power Plant in New Taipei City underwent maintenance.
 14 December – The launch of the second phase of 40 kWp photovoltaic power generation in Taiping Island, Kaohsiung.
 15–16 December – Cross-Strait CEO Summit in Taipei.
 16 December – The opening of Taipei Children's Amusement Park in Taipei.
 25 December – The upgrade of Taoyuan from county to special municipality.
 27 December – The inauguration of the Ministry of National Defense new building complex in Dazhi area of Taipei.

Deaths
 2 January – Li Tai-hsiang, 72, Taiwanese Amis composer and songwriter.
11 January – Chai Trong-rong, 78, Taiwanese politician, MLY (1993–1996, 1997–2012).
17 February – Frankie Kao, 63, Taiwanese singer.
 13 March – Wang King-ho, 97, Taiwanese physician.
 1 May – Chou Meng-tieh, 92, Taiwanese poet and writer.
 26 May – Yu Chen Yueh-ying, 87, Taiwanese politician, Kaohsiung County Magistrate (1985–1993), MLY (1984–1985).
 1 June – Chang Feng-hsu, 85, Taiwanese politician, Pingtung County Magistrate (1964–73), Mayor of Taipei (1972–76), Minister of the Interior (1976–78).
23 July – Yeh Ken-chuang, 82, Taiwanese carpenter, plane crash.
 15 August – Chen Kuei-miao, 81, Taiwanese politician, MLY (1990–1998), co-founder of the New Party.
 2 September – Su Nan-cheng, 78, Taiwanese politician, Mayor of Tainan (1977–1985), Mayor of Kaohsiung (1985–1990).
 24 September – , 57, Taiwanese politician, Mayor of Miaoli City (2006–2010).
 5 October – Tsai Wan-tsai, 85, Taiwanese financier (Fubon Group).
 6 October – Chen Chi-lu, 91, Taiwanese politician, Minister of the Council for Cultural Affairs (1981–1988).
 27 November – Wang Yung-tsai, 93, Taiwanese industrialist (Formosa Plastics).

References

 
Years of the 21st century in Taiwan
Taiwan
Taiwan
2010s in Taiwan